Isiolo is a town in Isiolo County, of which it is the capital. It is located in the upper eastern region of Kenya and geographically considered the centre of the country Kenya. It lies 285 kilometres north of the capital Nairobi. The town grew around the local military camps, much of the population being descendants of former Somali soldiers who had fought in World War I as well as other Cushitic-speaking pastoral communities and the Ameru community. The town has an estimated population of 120,000people, most of them living around the outskirts of the town. Like most African cities, there has been a steady increase in the urban population in recent years, especially moving from as far as Moyale, Marsabit and Mandera. Isiolo town is also becoming a centre of interest because of its newly acquired status as a resort city cashing in on the popular Samburu and Shaba Game reserves, which have become preferred destinations after the famed Maasai Mara. Isiolo lies along the long A2 Road, leading towards Marsabit and Moyale much further north.

Overview 
Isiolo is set to become a major part of Kenya's economic development plan Vision 2030. The plan calls for Isiolo to become a tourist centre that will include casinos, hotels, upscale retail outlets, a modern airport and transport facilities. Isiolo will also be a transport hub as the location of the fork of the LAPSSET.

Isiolo District was designated as the Headquarters of the Northern frontier Districts while it was under the British East Africa Protectorate in 1922, until the North Eastern was carved out as a separate province in 1963 when Kenya gained its independence.

Isiolo is also known for its large market, while brass, copper and aluminium jewellery-making is a local industry. Isiolo town is also a transport hub to the northern border town of Moyale. Trucks to and from Moyale make stop-overs boosting the hotel business in the town centre. Isiolo has been the headquarters of N.F.D.(Northern Frontier Districts) since the issue of the District Ordinance act 1937 & NFD commission 1962. During colonial days people from the other civil-administered districts of Kenya needed a special pass to visit Isiolo. Isiolo was made the headquarters of the District Commissioner, and the NFD was a closed district, as there was previously no urban centre to serve as district headquarters.
The Samburu, Buffalo Springs and Shaba National Reserves lie north of the town, while Lewa Downs reserve is located south of Isiolo. The Meru National Park lies in the North East of the town.

Since 1995, the town has been the seat of the Vicariate Apostolic of Isiolo. On July 14, 2005, Bishop Luigi Locati, who represented the Roman Catholic Church in Isiolo, was murdered. The High Court sent Father Guyo Waqo Malley and four others — Mohamed Molu, Aden Ibrahim Mohammed, Mahati Ali Halake and Roba Balla Bariche — to the gallows for planning and murdering Bishop Luigi Locati.

The town of Isiolo is small but cosmopolitan. With a scenic beauty of hills surrounding the town and including an eclectic mix of peoples and cultures, Isiolo is home to the Niger–Congo and Nilo-Saharan-speaking Ameru, Samburu and Turkana, as well as the Cushitic-speaking Rendille, Somali and Boran people. The Somali residents, who first settled in the area as soldiers after World War I, are mostly business people who engage in livestock farming. Additionally, there are some Indian shopkeepers.

The town is majority Muslim and has several mosques. The Jamia mosque is the largest of all and also a remarkable landmark. The Catholic church's twin bell towers are also among the remarkable landmarks of Isiolo town.

Generally the town has hot climate and has avenues of trees within the town to provide shade. During June–August period the town experiences strong dry winds and is generally very dusty.

Daisy Waugh's book A Small Town in Africa (1994) is about six months Waugh spent living in Isiolo.

American actress Drew Barrymore opened The Barrymore Learning Academy, a school in Isiolo, in 2004.

Notable people 
Grace Lolim is a human rights and peace activist, the chair of the Isiolo Peace Committee.

Transport
Isiolo is on the paved A2 highway from Nairobi to the Ethiopian border. The town is served by Isiolo Airport, which has been upgraded to an international airport to serve tourism and local exports.

Capital Change 
George Wajackoyah in his manifesto mentioned that he would change the national capital of Kenya to Isiolo.

See also 
Isiolo massacre

References

External links 
 Isiolo travel guide
 Isiolo, Kenya

Populated places in Isiolo County
County capitals in Kenya